James McCabe is the name of:

James D. McCabe (1842-1883), American author
James McCabe (judge) (1844–1911), Justice of the Indiana Supreme Court
James H. McCabe (1870–1957), American lawyer and politician
Jimmy McCabe (1918–1989), Northern Irish footballer
Jim McCabe (politician) (1922–2019), Australian politician
Jim McCabe (fl. 1990s–2010s), Irish broadcaster
James McCabe (tennis) (born 2003), Australian tennis player